Woodbridge High School is a co-educational secondary school located in Woodford Green in the London Borough of Redbridge, London, England.

The school's Headteacher is Steven Nethanial Hogan.

Woodbridge has over 1,900 pupils and over 160 members of staff. The school's motto is "Pride in Achievement".

The catchment area for Woodbridge is wide, and includes the Orchard Estate council housing area nearby whilst also stretching up as far as the Church End Ward in South Woodford. Many pupils come from the surrounding areas such as Walthamstow, Gants Hill and Ilford. The nearest tube stations are Woodford and South Woodford on the London Underground Central line.

Pupil development and pastoral care
A pastoral system ensures academic and personal progress, as well as a safe environment in which to learn. Pupils are placed in mixed ability tutor groups. The same team of form tutors led by the year co-ordinator stays with the group for five years until the sixth form. The welfare and progress of every pupil is monitored with annual school reports, covering their achievement, attendance and good behaviour, which was recognised in their 2005 Ofsted report.

The ratio of computers to students is 1:3. There is a Sports Hall and a Library, and the school also has a music studio, two drama studios and scientific practical classrooms as well as general classrooms. The two main buildings, Mallards and Wynndale, are situated either side of an all-weather sports pitch. Some departments have their own ICT facilities and the majority of classrooms are equipped with interactive white boards.

Curriculum
At Key Stage 3 (Years 7–9) all pupils study English, Mathematics, Science, Technology, History, Geography, two Modern Foreign Languages, Art, Music, Drama, ICT, Religious Education, Physical Education and Life Studies. Pupils are mainly taught in mixed ability groups, although there is some ability related setting in Mathematics and Languages.

At Key Stage 4 (years 10–11) all pupils are prepared for GCSE qualifications. Most pupils are entered for 9 - 10 GCSEs. They study English Literature, English Language, Mathematics, Science, a modern language, history or geography, and take part in some form of Physical Education. They also choose options from a very wide range of subjects. The subjects offered are Art & Design, Business Studies, Child Development, Computer Science, Design Technology, Drama, French, Spanish, German, Russian, Geography, History, Information Technologies, Media Studies, Music, Physical Education, Psychology, Religious Studies and Sociology. Students may take vocational courses in Business and Health & Social Care. A Study Support option is available for students who need support with their GCSE subjects.

Extra-Curricular
The school has a TAFAL programme. "Teach A Friend A Language" is a scheme where pupils are encouraged to learn new languages from fellow students and enter a competition. The format has been adopted by schools nationwide.

There are also extra-curricular sports activities that all students can participate in. This includes basketball, football, netball, rounders, trampolining.

Woodbridge High School has a Music Department which encourages students of all abilities to join various clubs and be a part of the two concerts it puts on every year. The orchestra also plays for the annual Drama production, playing professional-level music from scores such as Oliver! and Bugsy Malone. In March 2015, the choir went to Edinburgh on its first music tour, performing in Edinburgh Castle and Cathedral to sight-seers. Other ensembles include Guitar and Ukulele Club, Jazz Ensemble and Wind Ensemble. Students are helped to put together their own groups, and A Level students are encouraged to perform the compositions they wrote as part of their course.

Multiculturalism
Woodbridge accepts children from all and any religious and ethnic backgrounds, with many of the students having English as a second or even third language. The school has holds annual events celebrating different cultures, such as Chinese New Year and Black History Month, which all students are encouraged to take part in and learn about.

The Site
There are three main buildings in Woodbridge High School known as Mallards, Roding and Wynndale, along with the Sports Hall, which is situated in the central field and the Business Centre, which contains business classrooms. The school also has a large playground with 3 sets of basketball hoops, 2 large court areas, and various grassy areas.

Mallards
Mallards is a three-floor building situated at the Broadmead Road end of the site. It contains the school's main office, and the departments of Science, English, Business, Psychology, Languages and Media. There is a library and a learning support department. There is also a canteen known as "Mallards Canteen" and a large Sixth Form suite upstairs, including a common room for students to socialise, two private study areas, and the recent addition of a cafe area where 6th Form students can purchase a variety of hot and cold food and drink.

Wynndale
Wynndale is the more modern building on the site, and is accessible by the St Barnabas Road gate. The building holds the school's main canteen and Wynndale Hall, where most of the school's events are held and exams take place. The main subject areas taught in Wynndale are Maths, Geography, and Religious Studies, with the Technology block situated at the rear of the building.

Roding Creative Arts
The Roding building is Woodbridge's new block. It goes three-floors with the facilities for Drama, Music, History, Art and Computing. It includes a disabled access lift and an auditorium for drama and music performances.

Fitness Centre 
The fitness centre is a new building situated in between the Mallards building and Business Centre. It has facilities for boys and girls changing rooms, a fitness suite, and a dance studio. The fitness suite has revolutionary new gym machines which run on air pressure as well as the normal treadmills and bikes.

References

External links
 A virtual panoramic tour of the school.
 The Ofsted school page

Secondary schools in the London Borough of Redbridge
Community schools in the London Borough of Redbridge